"Thy kingdom come" is a phrase in the Lord's Prayer in the Bible.

Thy Kingdom Come is also a 2008 album by CeCe Winans.

Thy Kingdom Come may also refer to:

 Thy Kingdom Come (film), a 2018 short film
 Thy Kingdom Come (King T album), an album by King T slated for release in 1998 that was commercially released in 2002 with the name The Kingdom Come
 "Thy Kingdom Come" (Kingdom Hospital), a 2004 episode of the TV show Kingdom Hospital
 "Thy Kingdom Come" (Morbid Angel song), a 1991 song by Morbid Angel
 Thy Kingdom Come (Russell book), an 1891 volume of Millennial Dawn (later retitled Studies in the Scriptures) written by Charles Taze Russell
 Thy Kingdom Come (short story collection), a short story collection by Simon Morden

See also 
 Kingdom Come (disambiguation)
 "Thy Kingdom Come MMXIV", a 2014 song by Manowar
 Til Kingdom Come (disambiguation)
 To Kingdom Come (disambiguation)